Trachydora anthrascopa is a moth in the family Cosmopterigidae. It is found in Australia, where it has been recorded from New South Wales.

References

Natural History Museum Lepidoptera generic names catalog

Trachydora
Moths of Australia